Stephen John Barclay is a New Zealander who has worked in the real estate business as well as the government sector, and who was the CEO of the America's Cup Event Authority for the 34th America's Cup in 2013 during the inauguration of the AC72 wing-sail catamarans. Barclay was a member of the 2010 America's Cup winners, BMW Oracle Racing. Core Builders produced the 40m-high wingsails for the AC72 and AC45 boats. Barclay stressed in an op-ed the nature of the event:

Barclay's event was marred by the death of Andrew (Bart) Simpson in a capsize. Subsequent investigations prompted the US Coast Guard to permit the event only if the competitors were bound by the 37 recommendations of the investigations committee, because they would be part of the permit.

References

World champions in sailing for New Zealand
2007 America's Cup sailors
2010 America's Cup sailors
Maritime incidents in the United States
Maritime incidents in 2013
2013 in sailing